SS Port Kembla was a steamer owned by the Commonwealth and Dominion Line and named after Port Kembla, New South Wales, Australia. During an inquiry held in Wellington, New Zealand, shortly after the sinking it was thought that the explosion was from an internal source rather than a mine.   rescued the survivors.

When she sank, the ship was fully laden with frozen produce, wool, skins, tallow, jams, lead, and general cargo which was being shipped from Australia to the United Kingdom for use during World War I.

In 1977, a plan to salvage 1,200 tonnes of lead from the wreck did not come to fruition because of ownership disputes. As of 2012, plans were being made for a second attempt to recover the lead.

References

Shipwrecks of New Zealand
1917 in New Zealand
Steamships
Ships built on the River Tyne
1910 ships
Ships sunk by mines
Maritime incidents in 1917
Ships sunk with no fatalities
World War I shipwrecks in the Pacific Ocean
Wreck diving sites
Underwater diving sites in New Zealand